"Haters" is a song by UK garage/hip hop group So Solid Crew which was released as a single on 7 January 2002. It reached number 8 on the UK Singles Chart. It was the third of five consecutive top 20 hit singles for the group. The music video was directed by Andy Hylton.

The song was mentioned in the 2011 film Anuvahood.

References

2001 songs
2002 singles
So Solid Crew songs
Relentless Records singles